On 18 May 2022, a wildfire killed at least 3 people and destroyed thousands of pine-trees in Sherani District of Balochistan, Pakistan.

There are forests of Chilgoza in this area and these forests have been engulfed in fire. The fire spread over an area of about five to six kilometers and efforts are being made to extinguish it. 

Three people were killed and three were injured when locals tried to put out the blaze. The dead and injured have been shifted to Zhob Civil Hospital. According to the forest department, the fire started due to lightning or negligence of the local nomads. Due to the dry weather, the fire is spreading rapidly, while the fire has damaged wildlife, including chilgoza and olive trees.

References

2022 in Pakistan
May 2022 events in Pakistan
Fires in Pakistan
Wildfires in Pakistan
2022 wildfires
2022 meteorology
Sherani District